The Fonte Grande State Park  is a state park in the state of Espírito Santo, Brazil.

Location

The Fonte Grande State Park is in the Central Massif of Vitória island, in the municipality of Vitória, Espírito Santo.
The Central Massif also contains the Gruta da Onça Park, Pedra dos Olhos Ecological Reserve and the Tabuazeiro Park, which has  of Atlantic Forest remnants.
There are radio and television towers on the top of the Fonte Grande hill, outside the park area.

There are several springs on the slopes including São Benedito, Cazuza e Morcego. 
The park has rugged terrain with valleys and ridges, rising to an elevation of almost .
There are natural viewpoints looking over Vitória and its surroundings.
The park has four lookouts, two on the slopes and two at the top.
The park holds characteristic Atlantic Forest vegetation.
It contains an environmental education center.
The park is open Tuesday to Sunday from 8:00 to 17:00 hours.

History

The Fonte Grande neighborhood was a slave refuge in the 17th century.
The hill is named for the many sources of water it contains.
It was occupied from the start of the 19th century, with wooden shacks gradually spreading up the slopes.
The Fonte Grande State Park was constituted with an area of 218 hectares through law 3.875 of 7 August 1986.
The park was inaugurated in 2001 and is administered by the municipality of Vitória. 
The administrative headquarters of the park are at the high point, where the TV towers stand, and can be reached by car.

Notes

Sources

State parks of Brazil
Protected areas established in 1986
1986 establishments in Brazil
Protected areas of Espírito Santo
Category:Protected areas of Obvio News